China Syndrome may refer to:

 "China syndrome", a nuclear meltdown scenario so named for the fanciful idea that there would be nothing to stop the meltdown tunneling its way to the other side of the world ("China")
The China Syndrome, a 1979 film inspired by the scenario
 "China Syndrome", the final episode of the television sitcom The King of Queens

See also
China Crisis

cs:Čínský syndrom
da:Kinasyndrom
el:Σύνδρομο της Κίνας
es:Síndrome de China
fr:Syndrome chinois
pl:Chiński syndrom
ro:Sindromul China
ru:Китайский синдром